Chokchai Chuchai (born April 19, 1988) is a Thai professional footballer who plays for Nakhon Pathom United in the Thai League 2.

Honours

Club
Buriram PEA
 Thailand Premier League Champions (1) : 2008

Muangthong United
 Thai Premier League Champions (1) : 2009

External links
 Goal.com 
 Players Profile - info.thscore.com
https://th.soccerway.com/players/chokchai-chuchai/334257/

1988 births
Living people
Chokchai Chuchai
Chokchai Chuchai
Association football defenders
Chokchai Chuchai
Chokchai Chuchai
Chokchai Chuchai
Chokchai Chuchai
Chokchai Chuchai
Chokchai Chuchai
Chokchai Chuchai
Chokchai Chuchai
Chokchai Chuchai